Rubicon Retail was a British retail group which traded between 2002 and 2006.

The firm was formed in 2002 when a management buyout of several firms then owned by  Arcadia Group took place. This resulted in high street chains Warehouse and Principles, and catalogue retailers Hawkshead and Racing Green, being transferred from Arcadia to Rubicon. Warehouse had been part of Arcadia since 1999, having previously been part of Sears plc, and Principles had been founded by Arcadia's predecessor Burton Group in 1984.

During its lifetime Rubicon sold off Hawkshead and Racing Green, and purchased the Shoe Studio Group, which operated from a series of upmarket shoe retail stores.

In 2006, Rubicon was taken over by Mosaic Fashions, owner of the Karen Millen, Whistles, Oasis and Coast chains. In 2009, following the collapse of Mosaic, Warehouse ended up in the hands of Mosaic's successor, Aurora Fashions, with Principles ultimately being bought out by Debenhams - which had been part of the same company as Principles (the pre-Arcadia Burton Group) between 1984 and 1998, and had a number of Principles concessions in its stores.

Clothing retailers of the United Kingdom
British companies established in 2002
Retail companies established in 2002
Retail companies disestablished in 2006
Defunct retail companies of the United Kingdom